Paid to Love is a 1927 American silent comedy film directed by Howard Hawks and written by Malcolm Stuart Boylan, William M. Conselman, Benjamin Glazer, and Seton I. Miller. The film stars George O'Brien, Virginia Valli, J. Farrell MacDonald, William Powell, Thomas Jefferson, and Hank Mann. The film was released on July 23, 1927, by Fox Film Corporation.

Plot

Cast
George O'Brien as Crown Prince Michael
Virginia Valli as Dolorès
J. Farrell MacDonald as Peter Roberts
William Powell as Prince Eric
Thomas Jefferson as King
Hank Mann as Servant
Merta Sterling as Maid

References

External links

1927 films
1920s English-language films
Fox Film films
Silent American comedy films
1927 comedy films
Films directed by Howard Hawks
American black-and-white films
American silent feature films
1920s American films